Our Crazy Aunts in the South Seas is a 1964 Austrian comedy film directed by Rolf Olsen and starring Gunther Philipp, Gus Backus, and Udo Jürgens. It was the final part in a trilogy of films that also included Our Crazy Aunts and Our Crazy Nieces. Barbara Frey was cast in the role that had been played by Vivi Bach in the two previous films.

The film's sets were designed by the art director Leo Metzenbauer. Location shooting took place in the Canary Islands.

Cast

References

Bibliography

External links 
 

1964 films
1964 musical comedy films
Austrian musical comedy films
1960s German-language films
Films directed by Rolf Olsen
Films set in Oceania
Films shot in the Canary Islands
Austrian sequel films
Cross-dressing in film
Constantin Film films